The Casual Route is the easiest technical climbing route up the Diamond (east face) of Longs Peak.

References

External links 
rockclimbing.com
mountainproject.com
summitpost.org

Climbing routes
Rocky Mountain National Park